Constantius II (Latin: Flavius Julius Constantius; ; 7 August 317 – 3 November 361) was Roman emperor from 337 to 361. His reign saw constant warfare on the borders against the Sasanian Empire and Germanic peoples, while internally the Roman Empire went through repeated civil wars, court intrigues, and usurpations. His religious policies inflamed domestic conflicts that would continue after his death.

Constantius was a son of Constantine the Great, who elevated him to the imperial rank of Caesar on 8 November 324 and after whose death Constantius became Augustus together with his brothers, Constantine II and Constans on 9 September 337. He promptly oversaw the massacre of his father-in-law, an uncle, and several cousins, consolidating his hold on power. The brothers divided the empire among themselves, with Constantius receiving Greece, Thrace, the Asian provinces, and Egypt in the east. For the following decade a costly and inconclusive war against Persia took most of Constantius's time and attention. In the meantime, his brothers Constantine and Constans warred over the western provinces of the empire, leaving the former dead in 340 and the latter as sole ruler of the west. The two remaining brothers maintained an uneasy peace with each other until, in 350, Constans was overthrown and assassinated by the usurper Magnentius.

Unwilling to accept Magnentius as co-ruler, Constantius waged a civil war against the usurper, defeating him at the battles of Mursa Major in 351 and Mons Seleucus in 353. Magnentius committed suicide after the latter battle, leaving Constantius as sole ruler of the empire. In 351, Constantius elevated his cousin Constantius Gallus to the subordinate rank of Caesar to rule in the east, but had him executed three years later after receiving scathing reports of his violent and corrupt nature. Shortly thereafter, in 355, Constantius promoted his last surviving cousin, Gallus' younger half-brother Julian, to the rank of Caesar.

As emperor, Constantius promoted Arian heresy, banned pagan sacrifices, and issued laws against Jews. His military campaigns against Germanic tribes were successful: he defeated the Alamanni in 354 and campaigned across the Danube against the Quadi and Sarmatians in 357. The war against the Sasanians, which had been in a lull since 350, erupted with renewed intensity in 359 and Constantius travelled to the east in 360 to restore stability after the loss of several border fortresses. However, Julian claimed the rank of Augustus in 360, leading to war between the two after Constantius' attempts to persuade Julian to back down failed. No battle was fought, as Constantius became ill and died of fever on 3 November 361 in Mopsuestia, allegedly naming Julian as his rightful successor before his death.

Early life

Constantius was born in 317 at Sirmium, Pannonia. He was the third son of Constantine the Great, and second by his second wife Fausta, the daughter of Maximian. Constantius was made caesar by his father on 8 November 324. In 336, religious unrest in Armenia and tense relations between Constantine and king Shapur II caused war to break out between Rome and Sassanid Persia. Though he made initial preparations for the war, Constantine fell ill and sent Constantius east to take command of the eastern frontier. Before Constantius arrived, the Persian general Narses, who was possibly the king's brother, overran Mesopotamia and captured Amida. Constantius promptly attacked Narses, and after suffering minor setbacks defeated and killed Narses at the Battle of Narasara. Constantius captured Amida and initiated a major refortification of the city, enhancing the city's circuit walls and constructing large towers. He also built a new stronghold in the hinterland nearby, naming it Antinopolis.

Augustus in the East 

In early 337, Constantius hurried to Constantinople after receiving news that his father was near death. After Constantine died, Constantius buried him with lavish ceremony in the Church of the Holy Apostles. Soon after his father's death Constantius supposedly ordered a massacre of his relatives descended from the second marriage of his paternal grandfather Constantius Chlorus (also known as Constantius I), though the details are unclear. Eutropius, writing between 350 and 370, states that Constantius merely sanctioned “the act, rather than commanding it”. The massacre killed two of Constantius' uncles and six of his cousins, including Hannibalianus and Dalmatius, rulers of Pontus and Moesia respectively. The massacre left Constantius, his older brother Constantine II, his younger brother Constans, and three cousins Gallus, Julian and Nepotianus as the only surviving male relatives of Constantine the Great.

Soon after, Constantius met his brothers in Pannonia at Sirmium to formalize the partition of the empire. Constantius received the eastern provinces, including Constantinople, Thrace, Asia Minor, Syria, Egypt, and Cyrenaica; Constantine received Britannia, Gaul, Hispania, and Mauretania; and Constans, initially under the supervision of Constantine II, received Italy, Africa, Illyricum, Pannonia, Macedonia, and Achaea.

Constantius then hurried east to Antioch to resume the war with Persia. While Constantius was away from the eastern frontier in early 337, King Shapur II assembled a large army, which included war elephants, and launched an attack on Roman territory, laying waste to Mesopotamia and putting the city of Nisibis under siege. Despite initial success, Shapur lifted his siege after his army missed an opportunity to exploit a collapsed wall. When Constantius learned of Shapur's withdrawal from Roman territory, he prepared his army for a counter-attack.

Constantius repeatedly defended the eastern border against invasions by the aggressive Sassanid Empire under Shapur. These conflicts were mainly limited to Sassanid sieges of the major fortresses of Roman Mesopotamia, including Nisibis (Nusaybin), Singara, and Amida (Diyarbakir). Although Shapur seems to have been victorious in most of these confrontations, the Sassanids were able to achieve little. However, the Romans won a decisive victory at the Battle of Narasara, killing Shapur's brother, Narses. Ultimately, Constantius was able to push back the invasion, and Shapur failed to make any significant gains.

Meanwhile, Constantine II desired to retain control of Constans' realm, leading the brothers into open conflict. Constantine was killed in 340 near Aquileia during an ambush. As a result, Constans took control of his deceased brother's realms and became sole ruler of the Western two-thirds of the empire. This division lasted until 350, when Constans was assassinated by forces loyal to the usurper Magnentius.

War against Magnentius

As the only surviving son of Constantine the Great, Constantius felt that the position of emperor was his alone, and he determined to march west to fight the usurper, Magnentius. However, feeling that the east still required some sort of imperial presence, he elevated his cousin Constantius Gallus to caesar of the eastern provinces. As an extra measure to ensure the loyalty of his cousin, he married the elder of his two sisters, Constantina, to him.

Before facing Magnentius, Constantius first came to terms with Vetranio, a loyal general in Illyricum who had recently been acclaimed emperor by his soldiers. Vetranio immediately sent letters to Constantius pledging his loyalty, which Constantius may have accepted simply in order to stop Magnentius from gaining more support. These events may have been spurred by the action of Constantina, who had since traveled east to marry Gallus. Constantius subsequently sent Vetranio the imperial diadem and acknowledged the general's new position as augustus. However, when Constantius arrived, Vetranio willingly resigned his position and accepted Constantius’ offer of a comfortable retirement in Bithynia.

In 351, Constantius clashed with Magnentius in Pannonia with a large army. The ensuing Battle of Mursa Major was one of the largest and bloodiest battles ever between two Roman armies. The result was a victory for Constantius, but a costly one. Magnentius survived the battle and, determined to fight on, withdrew into northern Italy. Rather than pursuing his opponent, however, Constantius turned his attention to securing the Danubian border, where he spent the early months of 352 campaigning against the Sarmatians along the middle Danube. After achieving his aims, Constantius advanced on Magnentius in Italy. This action led the cities of Italy to switch their allegiance to him and eject the usurper's garrisons. Again, Magnentius withdrew, this time to southern Gaul.

In 353, Constantius and Magnentius met for the final time at the Battle of Mons Seleucus in southern Gaul, and again Constantius emerged the victor. Magnentius, realizing the futility of continuing his position, committed suicide on 10 August 353.

Sole ruler of the empire

Constantius spent much of the rest of 353 and early 354 on campaign against the Alamanni on the Danube frontier. The campaign was successful and raiding by the Alamanni ceased temporarily. In the meantime, Constantius had been receiving disturbing reports regarding the actions of his cousin Gallus. Possibly as a result of these reports, Constantius concluded a peace with the Alamanni and traveled to Mediolanum (Milan).

In Mediolanum, Constantius first summoned Ursicinus, Gallus’ magister equitum, for reasons that remain unclear. Constantius then summoned Gallus and Constantina. Although Gallus and Constantina complied with the order at first, when Constantina died in Bithynia, Gallus began to hesitate. However, after some convincing by one of Constantius’ agents, Gallus continued his journey west, passing through Constantinople and Thrace to Poetovio (Ptuj) in Pannonia.

In Poetovio, Gallus was arrested by the soldiers of Constantius under the command of Barbatio. Gallus was then moved to Pola and interrogated. Gallus claimed that it was Constantina who was to blame for all the trouble while he was in charge of the eastern provinces. This angered Constantius so greatly that he immediately ordered Gallus' execution. He soon changed his mind, however, and recanted the order. Unfortunately for Gallus, this second order was delayed by Eusebius, one of Constantius' eunuchs, and Gallus was executed.

Religious issues

Paganism
Laws dating from the 350s prescribed the death penalty for those who performed or attended pagan sacrifices, and for the worshipping of idols. Pagan temples were shut down, and the Altar of Victory was removed from the Senate meeting house. There were also frequent episodes of ordinary Christians destroying, pillaging and desecrating many ancient pagan temples, tombs and monuments.
Paganism was still popular among the population at the time. The emperor's policies were passively resisted by many governors and magistrates.

In spite of this, Constantius never made any attempt to disband the various Roman priestly colleges or the Vestal Virgins. He never acted against the various pagan schools. At times, he actually made some effort to protect paganism. In fact, he even ordered the election of a priest for Africa. Also, he remained pontifex maximus and was deified by the Roman Senate after his death. His relative moderation toward paganism is reflected by the fact that it was over twenty years after his death, during the reign of Gratian, that any pagan senator protested his treatment of their religion.

Christianity
Although often considered an Arian, Constantius ultimately preferred a third, compromise version that lay somewhere in between Arianism and the Nicene Creed, retrospectively called Semi-Arianism. During his reign he attempted to mold the Christian church to follow this compromise position, convening several Christian councils. "Unfortunately for his memory the theologians whose advice he took were ultimately discredited and the malcontents whom he pressed to conform emerged victorious," writes the historian A.H.M. Jones. "The great councils of 359–60 are therefore not reckoned ecumenical in the tradition of the church, and Constantius II is not remembered as a restorer of unity, but as a heretic who arbitrarily imposed his will on the church."

Judaism
Judaism faced some severe restrictions under Constantius, who seems to have followed an anti-Jewish policy in line with that of his father. This included  edicts to limit the ownership of slaves by Jewish people and banning marriages between Jews and Christian women. Later edicts sought to discourage conversions from Christianity to Judaism by confiscating the apostate's property. However, Constantius' actions in this regard may not have been so much to do with Jewish religion as with Jewish business—apparently, privately owned Jewish businesses were often in competition with state-owned businesses. As a result, Constantius may have sought to provide an advantage to state-owned businesses by limiting the skilled workers and slaves available to Jewish businesses.

Further crises
On 11 August 355, the magister militum Claudius Silvanus revolted in Gaul. Silvanus had surrendered to Constantius after the Battle of Mursa Major. Constantius had made him magister militum in 353 with the purpose of blocking the German threats, a feat that Silvanus achieved by bribing the German tribes with the money he had collected. A plot organized by members of Constantius' court led the emperor to recall Silvanus. After Silvanus revolted, he received a letter from Constantius recalling him to Milan, but which made no reference to the revolt. Ursicinus, who was meant to replace Silvanus, bribed some troops, and Silvanus was killed.

Constantius realised that too many threats still faced the Empire, however, and he could not possibly handle all of them by himself. So on 6 November 355, he elevated his last remaining male relative, Julian, to the rank of caesar. A few days later, Julian was married to Helena, the last surviving sister of Constantius. Constantius soon sent Julian off to Gaul.

Constantius spent the next few years overseeing affairs in the western part of the empire primarily from his base at Mediolanum. In 357 he visited Rome for the only time in his life. The same year, he forced Sarmatian and Quadi invaders out of Pannonia and Moesia Inferior, then led a successful counter-attack across the Danube.

In the winter of 357–58, Constantius received ambassadors from Shapur II who demanded that Rome restore the lands surrendered by Narseh. Despite rejecting these terms, Constantius tried to avert war with the Sassanid Empire by sending two embassies to Shapur II. Shapur II nevertheless launched another invasion of Roman Mesopotamia. In 360, when news reached Constantius that Shapur II had destroyed Singara (Sinjar), and taken Kiphas (Hasankeyf), Amida (Diyarbakır), and Ad Tigris (Cizre), he decided to travel east to face the re-emergent threat.

Usurpation of Julian and crises in the east

In the meantime, Julian had won some victories against the Alamanni, who had once again invaded Roman Gaul. However, when Constantius requested reinforcements from Julian's army for the eastern campaign, the Gallic legions revolted and proclaimed Julian augustus.

On account of the immediate Sassanid threat, Constantius was unable to directly respond to his cousin's usurpation, other than by sending missives in which he tried to convince Julian to resign the title of augustus and be satisfied with that of caesar. By 361, Constantius saw no alternative but to face the usurper with force, and yet the threat of the Sassanids remained. Constantius had already spent part of early 361 unsuccessfully attempting to re-take the fortress of Ad Tigris. After a time he had withdrawn to Antioch to regroup and prepare for a confrontation with Shapur II. The campaigns of the previous year had inflicted heavy losses on the Sassanids, however, and they did not attempt another round of campaigns that year. This temporary respite in hostilities allowed Constantius to turn his full attention to facing Julian.

Death
Constantius immediately gathered his forces and set off west. However, by the time he reached Mopsuestia in Cilicia, it was clear that he was fatally ill and would not survive to face Julian. The sources claim that realising his death was near, Constantius had himself baptised by Euzoius, the Semi-Arian bishop of Antioch, and then declared that Julian was his rightful successor. Constantius II died of fever on 3 November 361.

Like Constantine the Great, he was buried in the Church of the Holy Apostles, in a porphyry sarcophagus that was described in the 10th century by Constantine VII Porphyrogenitus in the De Ceremoniis.

Marriages and children

Constantius II was married three times:

First to a daughter of his half-uncle Julius Constantius, whose name is unknown. She was a full-sister of Gallus and a half-sister of Julian. She died c. 352/3.

Second, to Eusebia, a woman of Macedonian origin, originally from the city of Thessalonica, whom Constantius married before his defeat of Magnentius in 353. She died in 360.

Third and lastly, in 360, to Faustina, who gave birth to Constantius' only child, a posthumous daughter named Flavia Maxima Constantia, who later married Emperor Gratian.

Family tree

Emperors are shown with a rounded-corner border with their dates as Augusti, names with a thicker border appear in both sections

1: Constantine's parents and half-siblings

2: Constantine's children

Reputation
Constantius II is a particularly difficult figure to judge properly due to the hostility of most sources toward him. A. H. M. Jones writes that Constantius "appears in the pages of Ammianus as a conscientious emperor but a vain and stupid man, an easy prey to flatterers. He was timid and suspicious, and interested persons could easily play on his fears for their own advantage." However, Kent and M. and A. Hirmer suggest that Constantius "has suffered at the hands of unsympathetic authors, ecclesiastical and civil alike. To orthodox churchmen he was a bigoted supporter of the Arian heresy, to Julian the Apostate and the many who have subsequently taken his part he was a murderer, a tyrant and inept as a ruler". They go on to add, "Most contemporaries seem in fact to have held him in high esteem, and he certainly inspired loyalty in a way his brother could not".

See also
Persian wars of Constantius II
Itineraries of the Roman emperors, 337–363

References

Sources

Ancient sources

Ammianus Marcellinus. Res Gestae.
Yonge, Charles Duke, trans. Roman History. London: Bohn, 1862. Online at Tertullian. Accessed 15 August 2009.
Rolfe, J.C., trans. History. 3 vols. Loeb ed. London: Heinemann, 1939–52. Online at LacusCurtius. Accessed 15 August 2009.
Hamilton, Walter, trans. The Later Roman Empire (A.D. 354–378). Harmondsworth: Penguin, 1986. [Abridged edition]
Athanasius of Alexandria.
Festal Index.
Atkinson, M., and Archibald Robertson, trans. Festal Letters. From Nicene and Post-Nicene Fathers, Second Series, Vol. 4. Edited by Philip Schaff and Henry Wace. Buffalo, NY: Christian Literature Publishing Co., 1892. Revised and edited for New Advent by Kevin Knight. Online at Christian Classics Ethereal Library. Accessed 15 August 2009.
Epistula encyclica (Encyclical letter). Summer 339.
Atkinson, M., and Archibald Robertson, trans. Encyclical letter. From Nicene and Post-Nicene Fathers, Second Series, Vol. 4. Edited by Philip Schaff and Henry Wace. Buffalo, NY: Christian Literature Publishing Co., 1892. Revised and edited for New Advent by Kevin Knight. Online at New Advent and Christian Classics Ethereal Library. Accessed 15 August 2009.
Apologia Contra Arianos (Defense against the Arians). 349.
Atkinson, M., and Archibald Robertson, trans. Apologia Contra Arianos. From Nicene and Post-Nicene Fathers, Second Series, Vol. 4. Edited by Philip Schaff and Henry Wace. Buffalo, NY: Christian Literature Publishing Co., 1892. Revised and edited for New Advent by Kevin Knight. Online at New Advent. Accessed 14 August 2009.
Apologia ad Constantium (Defense before Constantius). 353.
Atkinson, M., and Archibald Robertson, trans. Apologia ad Constantium. From Nicene and Post-Nicene Fathers, Second Series, Vol. 4. Edited by Philip Schaff and Henry Wace. Buffalo, NY: Christian Literature Publishing Co., 1892. Revised and edited for New Advent by Kevin Knight. Online at New Advent. Accessed 14 August 2009.
Historia Arianorum (History of the Arians). 357.
Atkinson, M., and Archibald Robertson, trans. Historia Arianorum. From Nicene and Post-Nicene Fathers, Second Series, Vol. 4. Edited by Philip Schaff and Henry Wace. Buffalo, NY: Christian Literature Publishing Co., 1892. Revised and edited for New Advent by Kevin Knight. Online at New Advent. Accessed 14 August 2009.
De Synodis (On the Councils of Arminium and Seleucia). Autumn 359.
Newman, John Henry and Archibald Robertson, trans. De Synodis. From Nicene and Post-Nicene Fathers, Second Series, Vol. 4. Edited by Philip Schaff and Henry Wace. Buffalo, NY: Christian Literature Publishing Co., 1892. Revised and edited for New Advent by Kevin Knight. Online at New Advent. Accessed 15 August 2009.
Historia acephala. 368 – c. 420.
Robertson, Archibald, trans. Historia Acephala. From Nicene and Post-Nicene Fathers, Second Series, Vol. 4. Edited by Philip Schaff and Henry Wace. Buffalo, NY: Christian Literature Publishing Co., 1892. Revised and edited for New Advent by Kevin Knight. Online at New Advent and Christian Classics Ethereal Library. Accessed 15 August 2009.
Chronica minora 1, 2.
Mommsen, T., ed. Chronica Minora saec. IV, V, VI, VII 1, 2 (in Latin). Monumenta Germaniae Historia, Auctores Antiquissimi 9, 11. Berlin, 1892, 1894. Accessed 25 August 2009.
Codex Theodosianus.
Mommsen, T. and Paul M. Meyer, eds. Theodosiani libri XVI cum Constitutionibus Sirmondianis et Leges novellae ad Theodosianum pertinentes2 (in Latin). Berlin: Weidmann, [1905] 1954. Complied by Nicholas Palmer, revised by Tony Honoré for Oxford Text Archive, 1984. Prepared for online use by R.W.B. Salway, 1999. Preface, books 1–8. Online at University College London and the University of Grenoble . Accessed 25 August 2009.
Unknown edition (in Latin). Online at AncientRome.ru. Accessed 15 August 2009.
Codex Justinianus.
Scott, Samuel P., trans. The Code of Justinian, in The Civil Law. 17 vols. 1932. Online at the Constitution Society. Accessed 14 August 2009.
Ephraem the Syrian. Carmina Nisibena (Songs of Nisibis).
Stopford, J.T. Sarsfield, trans. The Nisibene Hymns. From Nicene and Post-Nicene Fathers, Second Series, Vol. 13. Edited by Philip Schaff and Henry Wace. Buffalo, NY: Christian Literature Publishing Co., 1890. Revised and edited for New Advent by Kevin Knight. Online at New Advent. Accessed 16 August 2009.
Bickell, Gustav, trans. S. Ephraemi Syri Carmina Nisibena: additis prolegomenis et supplemento lexicorum Syriacorum (in Latin). Lipetsk: Brockhaus, 1866. Online at Google Books. Accessed 15 August 2009.
Epitome de Caesaribus.
Banchich, Thomas M., trans. A Booklet About the Style of Life and the Manners of the Imperatores. Canisius College Translated Texts 1. Buffalo, NY: Canisius College, 2009. Online at De Imperatoribus Romanis . Accessed 15 August 2009.
Eunapius. Lives of the Sophists.
Eusebius of Caesarea.
Oratio de Laudibus Constantini (Oration in Praise of Constantine, sometimes the Tricennial Oration).
Richardson, Ernest Cushing, trans. Oration in Praise of Constantine. From Nicene and Post-Nicene Fathers, Second Series, Vol. 1. Edited by Philip Schaff and Henry Wace. Buffalo, NY: Christian Literature Publishing Co., 1890. Revised and edited for New Advent by Kevin Knight. Online at New Advent. Accessed 16 August 2009.
Vita Constantini (Life of Constantine).
Richardson, Ernest Cushing, trans. Life of Constantine. From Nicene and Post-Nicene Fathers, Second Series, Vol. 1. Edited by Philip Schaff and Henry Wace. Buffalo, NY: Christian Literature Publishing Co., 1890. Revised and edited for New Advent by Kevin Knight. Online at New Advent. Accessed 25 August 2009.
Eutropius. Historiae Romanae Breviarium.
Watson, John Selby, trans. Abridgment of Roman History. London: George Bell & Sons, 1886. Revised and edited for Tertullian by Roger Pearse, 2003. Online at Tertullian. Accessed 11 June 2010.
Festus. Breviarium.
Banchich, Thomas M., and Jennifer A. Meka, trans. Breviarium of the Accomplishments of the Roman People. Canisius College Translated Texts 2. Buffalo, NY: Canisius College, 2001. Online at De Imperatoribus Romanis (Archive). Accessed 15 August 2009.
Firmicus Maternus. De errore profanarum religionum (On the error of profane religions).
Baluzii and Rigaltii, eds. Divi Cæcilii Cypriani, Carthaginensis Episcopi, Opera Omnia; accessit J. Firmici Materni, Viri Clarissimi, De Errore Profanarum Religionum (in Latin). Paris: Gauthier Brothers and the Society of Booksellers, 1836. Online at Google Books. Accessed 15 August 2009.
Hilary of Poitiers. Ad Constantium (To Constantius).
Feder, Alfred Leonhard, ed. S. Hilarii episcopi Pictaviensis Tractatus mysteriorum. Collectanea Antiariana Parisina (fragmenta historica) cum appendice (liber I Ad Constantium). Liber ad Constantium imperatorem (Liber II ad Constantium). Hymni. Fragmenta minora. Spuria (in Latin). In the Corpus Scriptorum Ecclesiasticorum Latinorum, Vol. 65. Vienna: Tempsky, 1916.
Itinerarium Alexandri (Itinerary of Alexander).
Mai, Angelo, ed. Itinerarium Alexandri ad Constantium Augustum, Constantini M. Filium (in Latin). Regiis Typis, 1818. Online at Google Books. Accessed 15 August 2009.
Davies, Iolo, trans. Itinerary of Alexander. 2009. Online at DocStoc. Accessed 15 August 2009.
Jerome.
Chronicon (Chronicle).
Pearse, Roger, et al., trans. The Chronicle of St. Jerome, in Early Church Fathers: Additional Texts. Tertullian, 2005. Online at Tertullian. Accessed 14 August 2009.
de Viris Illustribus (On Illustrious Men).
Richardson, Ernest Cushing, trans. De Viris Illustribus (On Illustrious Men). From Nicene and Post-Nicene Fathers, Second Series, Vol. 3. Edited by Philip Schaff and Henry Wace. Buffalo, NY: Christian Literature Publishing Co., 1892. Revised and edited for New Advent by Kevin Knight. Online at New Advent. Accessed 15 August 2009.
Julian.
Wright, Wilmer Cave, trans. Works of the Emperor Julian. 3 vols. Loeb ed. London: Heinemann, 1913. Online at the Internet Archive: Vol. 1, 2, 3.
Libanius. Oratio 59 (Oration 59).
M.H. Dodgeon, trans. The Sons of Constantine: Libanius Or. LIX. In From Constantine to Julian: Pagan and Byzantine Views, A Source History, edited by S.N.C. Lieu and Dominic Montserrat, 164–205. London: Routledge, 1996. 
Origo Constantini Imperatoris.
Rolfe, J.C., trans. Excerpta Valesiana, in vol. 3 of Rolfe's translation of Ammianus Marcellinus' History. Loeb ed. London: Heinemann, 1952. Online at LacusCurtius. Accessed 16 August 2009.
Papyri Abinnaeus.
The Abinnaeus Archive: Papers of a Roman Officer in the Reign of Constantius II (in Greek). Duke Data Bank of Documentary Papyri. Online at Perseus and the Duke Data Bank. Accessed 15 August 2009.
Papyri Laurentius.
Dai Papiri della Biblioteca Medicea Laurenziana (in Greek). Duke Data Bank of Documentary Papyri. Online at Perseus and the Duke Data Bank. Accessed 15 August 2009.
Philostorgius. Historia Ecclesiastica.
Walford, Edward, trans. Epitome of the Ecclesiastical History of Philostorgius, Compiled by Photius, Patriarch of Constantinople. London: Henry G. Bohn, 1855. Online at Tertullian. Accessed 15 August 2009.
Socrates. Historia Ecclesiastica (History of the Church).
Zenos, A.C., trans. Ecclesiastical History. From Nicene and Post-Nicene Fathers, Second Series, Vol. 2. Edited by Philip Schaff and Henry Wace. Buffalo, NY: Christian Literature Publishing Co., 1890. Revised and edited for New Advent by Kevin Knight. Online at New Advent. Accessed 14 August 2009.
Sozomen. Historia Ecclesiastica (History of the Church).
Hartranft, Chester D. Ecclesiastical History. From Nicene and Post-Nicene Fathers, Second Series, Vol. 2. Edited by Philip Schaff and Henry Wace. Buffalo, NY: Christian Literature Publishing Co., 1890. Revised and edited for New Advent by Kevin Knight. Online at New Advent. Accessed 15 August 2009.
Sulpicius Severus. Sacred History.
Roberts, Alexander, trans. Sacred History. From Nicene and Post-Nicene Fathers, Second Series, Vol. 11. Edited by Philip Schaff and Henry Wace. Buffalo, NY: Christian Literature Publishing Co., 1894. Revised and edited for New Advent by Kevin Knight. Online at New Advent. Accessed 14 August 2009.
Theodoret. Historia Ecclesiastica (History of the Church).
Jackson, Blomfield, trans. Ecclesiastical History. From Nicene and Post-Nicene Fathers, Second Series, Vol. 3. Edited by Philip Schaff and Henry Wace. Buffalo, NY: Christian Literature Publishing Co., 1892. Revised and edited for New Advent by Kevin Knight. Online at New Advent. Accessed 15 August 2009.
Themistius. Orationes (Orations).
Theophanes. Chronicle.
Zonaras. Extracts of History.
Zosimus. Historia Nova (New History).
Unknown trans. The History of Count Zosimus. London: Green and Champlin, 1814. Online at Tertullian. Accessed 15 August 2009. [An unsatisfactory edition.]
Unknown trans. Histoire Nouvelle and ΖΩΣΙΜΟΥ ΚΟΜΙΤΟΣ ΚΑΙ ΑΠΟΦΙΣΚΟΣΥΝΗΓΟΡΟΥ (in French and Greek). Online at the Catholic University of Louvain. Accessed 16 November 2009.

Modern sources

 Baker-Brian, N. and Tougher, S., The Sons of Constantine, AD 337-361: In the Shadows of Constantine and Julian (Palgrave MacMillan, 2020)
 Banchich, T.M., 'DIR-Gallus' from De Imperatoribus Romanis  
 Dignas, B. & Winter, E., Rome and Persia in Late Antiquity (Cambridge University Press, 2007)
 DiMaio, M., and Frakes, R., "Constantius II," from De Imperatoribus Romanis
 Gaddis, M., There is No Crime for Those who Have Christ (University of California Press, 2005).„
 Hunt, Constantius II in the Ecclesiastical Historians, Ph.D. diss. (Fordham University, 2010), AAT 3431914.
 Jones, A.H.M, The Later Roman Empire, 284–602: a Social, Economic and Administrative Survey (Baltimore: Johns Hopkins University, 1986)
 
 Kent, J.P.C., Hirmer, M. & Hirmer, A. Roman Coins (Thames and Hudson, 1978)
 Moser, Muriel. 2018. Emperor and Senators in the Reign of Constantius II. Cambridge University Press.
 Odahl, C.M., Constantine and the Christian Empire (Routledge, 2004)
 Pelikan, J.J., The Christian Tradition (University of Chicago, 1989)
 Potter, D.S., The Roman Empire at Bay: AD 180–395 (Routledge, 2004)
 Salzman, M.R., The Making of a Christian Aristocracy: Social and Religious Change in the Western Roman Empire (Harvard University Press, 2002)
 Schäfer, P., The History of the Jews in the Greco-Roman World (Routledge, 2003)
 
 Vagi, D.L. & Coquand, T., Coinage and History of the Roman Empire (Taylor & Francis, 2001)
 Vasiliev, A.A., History of the Byzantine Empire 324–1453 (University of Wisconsin Press, 1958)

External links

 This list of Roman laws of the fourth century shows laws passed by Constantius II relating to Christianity.

 
317 births
361 deaths
4th-century Christians
4th-century Roman emperors
4th-century Roman consuls
Arian Christians
Constantinian dynasty
Flavii
Illyrian people
Imperial Roman consuls
Infectious disease deaths in Turkey
Julii
People of the Roman–Sasanian Wars
People from Sirmium
Sons of Roman emperors
Burials at the Church of the Holy Apostles
Illyrian emperors